Alucita objurgatella, the objurgatella moth, is a moth of the family Alucitidae. It is known only from the Hawaiian islands of Kauai, Oahu, Maui and Hawaii, but is considered introduced although it could also be indigenous.

The larvae feed on the fruits, flowers and seeds of Psydrax odorata.

External links

Alucitidae
Moths described in 1907
Moths of Oceania